Bisphenol S (BPS) is an organic compound with the formula (HOC6H4)2SO2.  It has two phenol functional groups on either side of a sulfonyl group. It is commonly used in curing fast-drying epoxy resin adhesives.  It is classified as a bisphenol, and a close molecular analog of Bisphenol A (BPA). BPS differentiates from BPA by possessing a sulfone group (SO2) as the central linker of the molecule instead of a dimethylmethylene group (C(CH3)2), which is the case of Bisphenol A.

Use 

BPS is used in curing fast-drying epoxy glues and as a corrosion inhibitor. It is also commonly used as a reactant in polymer reactions.

BPS has become increasingly common as a building block in polyethersulfone and some epoxies, following the public awareness that BPA has estrogen-mimicking properties, and widespread-belief that enough of it remains in the products to be dangerous. However, BPS may have comparable estrogenic effects to BPA. BPS is now used to a variety of common consumer products. In some cases, BPS is used where the legal prohibition on BPA allows products (esp. plastic containers) containing BPS to be labelled "BPA free". BPS also has the advantage of being more stable to heat and light than BPA.

To comply with restrictions and regulations on BPA due to its confirmed toxicity, manufacturers are gradually replacing BPA with other related compounds, mainly bisphenol S, as substitutes in industrial applications.

BPS is also used as an anticorrosive agent in epoxy glues. Chemically, BPS is being used as a reagent in polymer reactions. BPS has also been reported to occur in canned foodstuffs, such as tin cans.

In a 2015 study analyzing BPS in a variety of paper products worldwide, BPS was found in 100% of tickets, mailing envelopes, airplane boarding passes, and airplane luggage tags. In this study, very high concentrations of BPS were detected in thermal receipt samples collected from cities in the United States, Japan, Korea, and Vietnam. The BPS concentrations were large but varied greatly, from a few tens of nanograms per gram to several milligrams per gram. Nevertheless, concentrations of BPS used in thermal paper are usually lower compared to those of BPA. Finally, BPS can get into the human body through dermal absorption from handling banknotes.

Health effects

Cardiac effects 
Although there is no direct link established between BPS and cardiac disease, it is thought that BPS may operate by a similar mechanism to BPA and could cause cardiac toxicity. In animal studies, BPS has been shown to hinder MI recovery, induce cardiac arrhythmias and cause cardiac developmental deformities. Rats exposed to high doses of BPS were reported to have increased risk of atherosclerosis (a significant risk factor in cardiac disease) due to BPS inducing synthesis of cholesterol in peripheral tissues.

Neurobehavioural effects 
BPS has the potential to have an effect on a wide range of neurological functions. A recent study showed that exposure to BPS during pregnancy may disrupt thyroid hormone levels. These are important in foetal neurodevelopment and prenatal exposure to BPS has been linked to impaired psychomotor development in children. In a study using human embryonic stem cells, BPS was shown to cause a reduction in length of neurites in neuron-like cells. This disruption could lead to neurobehavioral problems such as ASD.

The mechanism of the neurological impact of BPS is thought to be related to its oestrogenic effect which can interfere in the levels and action of thyroid hormone, which is essential for normal development of the nervous system; it regulates migration and differentiation of neural cells, synaptogenesis and myelination.

Effects on obesity 
It has been proposed that BPS has the potential to affect body weight, and several studies have found a correlation between exposure to bisphenols and increased body weight. This is thought to be due to an accumulation of lipids in adipocytes i.e. a build-up of fat in fat cells. It has also been suggested that BPS leads to the formation of new adipocytes as exposure to it increases the expression of related markers. A correlation between exposure to BPS before birth and being overweight has been found in mice, although this was only found when they were also fed a high fat diet.

The pathway through which BPS acts on cells to increase body weight is suggested to be different to the pathway through which BPA acts, even though they have very similar chemical structures.

Only one study has demonstrated a decrease in body weight after BPS exposure, and the affected mice quickly regained the weight they had lost.

Other metabolic effects 
BPS levels in the human body can be measured in the urine. In one study of children, there was a significant correlation between urinary levels of BPS and insulin resistance, abnormal kidney function and abnormal vascular function.

It has been suggested that there is a link between gestational diabetes mellitus and urinary BPS. Therefore, exposure to BPS may be a risk factor for developing the condition.

Effects on skeletal development 
The effect of long term exposure to BPS is an enrichment of osteoclast differentiation and enhanced development of the embryonic skeletal system.

Effects on early development 
BPS, like BPA, can cross the placenta in sheep and alter the endocrine functionality of the placenta. It does this by reducing the maternal serum concentration of trophoblastic proteins. BPS shows almost identical effects on the placenta as BPA, with both BPS and BPS altering almost identical sets of genes.

Fetal exposure to BPS through the placenta, during a critical period, can have negative effects on the developmental programming of the fetus. BPS exposure in the zebrafish model affected development of the hypothalamus and resulted in hyperactive behaviour.

Studies in the Mouse model have shown that exposure to BPS significantly reduced the secretion of testosterone within the mouse fetal testes, with exposure to BPS in female mice also causing a significant fall in egg number, whilst also negatively affecting the quality of oocytes.

Studies in the Zebrafish model have shown that parental exposure to BPS causes disrupted thyroid hormone levels in both the parental generation and F1 generation.

It is not clear the mechanism of BPS’s effect on thyroid hormone levels after human exposure.

Effects on reproductive health 
The endocrine disrupting nature of BPS has encouraged investigations into its affinity to estrogenic receptors, showing BPS to be a weak agonist; similar in potency to BPA, which it has come to substitute. Select studies show BPS to be capable of mimicking estradiol, and sometimes being more effective. The estrogenic activity of BPS has been demonstrated through in vivo rodent studies, inducing growth of the womb, with a range of dosages.

These are pathways necessary for cell function, cell cycle regulation, and neuroendocrine induced behaviours which are important for reproduction. BPS has shown to both disrupt signalling and damage DNA. Androgenic and antiandrogenic activity have also been confirmed by BPS disrupting function of the androgen receptors. Studies on zebrafish have shown decreased egg quality, reduced sperm count, an increased frequency of embryo abnormalities, as well as changes in the mass of gonads; suggesting that BPS is a reproductive toxin for both sexes.

Environmental considerations 
Recent work suggests that, like BPA, BPS also has endocrine disrupting properties. What makes BPS, and BPA, endocrine disruptors is the presence of the hydroxy group on the benzene ring. This phenol moiety allows BPA and BPS to mimic estradiol. In a study of human urine, BPS was found in 81% of the samples tested. Another study done on thermal receipt paper shows that 88% of human exposure to BPS is through receipts.

The recycling of thermal paper can introduce BPS into the cycle of paper production and cause BPS contamination of other types of paper products. A recent study showed presence of BPS in more than 70% of the household waste paper samples, potentially indicating spreading of BPS contamination through paper recycling.

BPS is more resistant to environmental degradation than BPA, and although not persistent cannot be characterised as readily biodegradable.

History 
BPS was first made in 1869 as a dye and is currently common in everyday consumer products. BPS is an analog of BPA that has replaced BPA in a variety of ways, being present in thermal receipt paper, plastics, and indoor dust. After health concerns associated with bisphenol A grew in 2012, BPS began to be used as a replacement.

Regulation 
In the US it is difficult for consumers to determine if a product contains BPS due to limited labelling regulations. In January 2023 the European Chemicals Agency added Bisphenol S to the Candidate List for SVHC 
designation, while it is investigated for reproductive toxicity and endocrine disruption.

Synthesis 
Bisphenol S is prepared by the reaction of two equivalents of phenol with one equivalent of sulfuric acid or oleum.

2 C6H5OH + H2SO4 → (C6H4OH)2SO2 + 2 H2O

2 C6H5OH + SO3 → (C6H4OH)2SO2 + H2O

This reaction can also produce 2,4'-sulfonyldiphenol, a common isomeric complication in electrophilic aromatic substitution reactions.

See also 
 Bisphenol A
 Tetramethyl Bisphenol F

References 

Bisphenols
Endocrine disruptors
Estrogens
Nonsteroidal antiandrogens
Benzosulfones